The 2003 European Junior Canoe Slalom Championships  were the 5th edition of the European Junior Canoe Slalom Championships. The event took place in Hohenlimburg, Germany from 10 to 13 July 2003 under the auspices of the European Canoe Association (ECA). A total of 8 medal events took place.

Medal summary

Men

Canoe

Kayak

Women

Kayak

Medal table

References

External links
European Canoe Association

European Junior and U23 Canoe Slalom Championships
European Junior and U23 Canoe Slalom Championships